Enchantimals is a media franchise-supported toy line launched on July 18, 2017, by American multinational toy company Mattel as a companion to Ever After High and the second spin-off to Monster High. The line consists of human–animal hybrids and their woodland creature pets who live in a fictional setting of Everwilde. The Enchantimals media include a web series, books, and a television special. The franchise development began in late 2015, it was announced in October 2016, and its toys were first released in June 2017.

Development and release 

Development began in late 2015 after Ever After High dolls ceased production. It was announced on October 12, 2016, and toys were first released in June 2017. The franchise originally began as part of the Ever After High franchise with the characters as smaller, animal-themed pixies. Trademarks were filed on January 14, 2016, for a line called "Pixie World", which was to be a pixie-centric arc that was to follow the introductions of two groups of pixies in mid December, 2015 and early June, 2016.

Following the discontinuation of the EAH toy line, the "Pixie World" line was scrapped, but served as the basis for Enchantimals. However, its heritage speaks only from its core concepts and is thus farther removed from its predecessors than Ever After High was from Monster High.

Enchantimals has not received similar marketing, being only recognizable as part of the greater whole due to similarities. It is unknown if this is intentional as a means for Mattel to start afresh, which is suggested by the avoiding of the high school setting, or a consequence of the cancellation and rebooting of the older two franchises. Like its predecessors with Bratz and Disney Princess, Enchantimals takes a cue or two from competing doll franchises.

My Little Pony's 2010 incarnation and its spin-off Equestria Girls, as well as the 2012 Littlest Pet Shop toy line, all done by Mattel's long-time main rival Hasbro, is the inspiration of Enchantimals themes of nature and group-based friendship. Mattel looked on into them as Hasbro made a deal with Disney to produce newer licensed toys and games. Mattel itself has pointed at the "popular animal aesthetic [as seen in] social media filters" as a direct inspiration for the franchise, though whether this means the earlier pixies were based on the filters or if the filters account for the design difference between the pixies and the Enchantimals is not specified. The choice for the small size of the Enchantimals dolls has been ascribed to the market influence of the 2014 franchise Shopkins with emphasis on its 2015 doll spinoff Shoppies.

Characters

Friendship Forest inhabitants
 Bren Bear (voiced by Rebecca Shoichet, Rachel Butera)
 Hixby Hedgehog
 Ohana Owl
 Raelin Raccoon
 Sancha Squirrel (voiced by Kimberly Woods)
 Kani & Yawn - owls of Ohana
 Pester & Romy - raccoons of Raelin
 Pointer - hedgehog of Hixby
 Snore & Zia - bears of Bren (Snore voiced by Rebecca Shoichet and Larissa Gallagher)
 Stumper - squirrel of Sancha

Frozenwood inhabitants
 Pawbry Polar Bear
 Preena Penguin (voiced by Rebecca Shoichet, Larissa Gallagher)
 Winsley Wolf (voiced by Polly Eachus)
 Jayla - penguin of Preena (voiced by Rebecca Shoichet, Kate Higgins and Larissa Gallagher)
 Melt - polar bear of Pawbry
 Trooper - wolf of Winsley

Grazy Grasslands inhabitants
 Cherish Cheetah (voiced by Noveen Crumbie)
 Ekaterina Elephant (voiced by Salome Mergia)
 Fanci Flamingo (voiced by Karen Strassman)
 Gillian Giraffe (voiced by Jeannie Elias)
 Liora Lion
 Merit Monkey (voiced by Salli Saffioti)
 Zelena Zebra (voiced by Francesca Manzi)
 Antic - elephant of Ekaterina
 Compass - monkey of Merit
 Hoofette - zebra of Zelena
 Kiba & Swash - flamingos of Fanci
 Pawl - giraffe of Gillian (voiced by Jeannie Elias)
 Quick-Quick - cheetah of Cherish (voiced by Noveen Crumbie)
 Snazzy - lion of Liora

Harvest Hills inhabitants
 Cailey Cow
 Cambrie Cow (voiced by Salli Saffioti)
 Ciesta Cat (voiced by Paula Rhodes)
 Dinah Duck (voiced by Lizzie Freeman)
 Haydie Horse (voiced by Paula Rhodes)
 Lluella Llama
 Lorna Lamb (voiced by Patty Mattson)
 Mayla Mouse
 Petya Pig
 Redward Rooster
 Banana, Butter, Corn & Sloh - ducks of Dinah
 Cheese, Mac & Ricotta - cows of Cambrie
 Climber - cat of Ciesta
 Cluck - rooster of Redward
 Curdle - cow of Cailey
 Flag - lamb of Lorna
 Fleecy - llama of Lluella
 Fondue - mouse of Mayla
 Nisha & Streusel - pigs of Petya
 Trotter - horse of Haydie

Junglewood inhabitants
 Andie Alligator
 Effie Elephant (voiced by Cristina Valenzuela)
 Hedda Hippo
 Karina Koala
 Larissa Lemur (voiced by Tara Sands)
 Mika Monkey (voiced by Kimberly Woods)
 Patter Peacock (voiced by Sabrina Pitre, Jonquil Goode)
 Peeki Parrot (voiced by Melissa Mabie)
 Prue Panda
 Sela Sloth (voiced by Cindy Robinson)
 Tadley Tiger
 Tamika Tree Frog (voiced by Cindy Robinson)
 Tanzie Tiger
 Burst - tree frog of Tamika
 Dab - koala of Karina
 Flap - peacock of Patter (voiced by Benjamin Diskin and Doug Erholtz)
 Kitty - white tiger of Tadley
 Lake - hippopotamus of Hedda
 Marshy - alligator of Andie
 Nari - panda of Prue
 Ringlet - lemur of Larissa
 Sheeny - parrot of Peeki
 Sway - elephant of Effie
 Swing - monkey of Mika
 Treebody - sloth of Sela
 Tuft - tiger of Tanzie

Petal Park inhabitants
 Baxi Butterfly
 Beetrice Bee
 Cay Caterpillar
 Dara Dragonfly
 Ladelia Ladybug
 Saxon Snail
 Dawdle - snail of Saxon
 Pollen - bee of Beetrice
 Scriggly - caterpillar of Cay
 Swift - dragonfly of Dara
 Vine - ladybug Ladelia
 Wingrid - butterfly Baxi

Royal Isle inhabitants
 Alessandro Lion
 Ambrose Unicorn
 Bannon Bear
 Braylee Bear
 Brystal Bunny
 Deanna Dragon (voiced by Cristina Vee)
 Fabrina Fox
 Falon Phoenix
 Maura Mermaid
 Paolina Pegasus
 Peola Pony
 Queen Daviana Deer
 Queen Paradise Peacock
 Queen Unity Unicorn
 Sarely Swan
 Bowey - bear of Bannon
 Catch - lion of Alessandro
 Climmer - unicorn of Ambrose
 Frisk - fox of Fabrina
 Glide - fish of Maura
 Grace, Scramble & Spring - bunnies of Brystal
 Grassy - deer of Queen Daviana
 Honey - bear of Braylee
 Petite - pony of Peola
 Pointe - swan of Sarely
 Rainbow - peacock of Queen Paradise
 Roast, Steam & Whisk - dragons of Deanna
 Stepper - unicorn of Queen Unity
 Sunrise - phoenix of Falon
 Wingley - pegasus of Paolina

Snowy Valley inhabitants
 Bevy Bunny (voiced by Debi Derryberry)
 Hawna Husky (voiced by Sarah Anne Williams)
 Nadie Narwhal
 Odele Owl
 Patterson Penguin (voiced by Jordan Quisno)
 Pristina Polar Bear (voiced by Cassandra Lee Morris)
 Rainey Reindeer
 Sashay Seal
 Sharlotte Squirrel
 Sybill Snow Leopard (voiced by Alex Cartana)
 Bubbler - seal of Sashay
 Cruise, Patrol, & Voyage - snowy owls of Odele
 Diver, Glacier, & Paddle - polar bears of Pristina
 Flake - snow leopard of Sybill
 Gallop, Jogger, & Marathon - reindeers of Rainey
 Jump - bunny of Bevy
 Sword - narwhal of Nadie
 Tux - penguin of Patterson
 Walnut - squirrel of Sharlotte
 Whiped Cream - husky of Hawna

Sunny Savanna inhabitants
 Esmeralda Elephant (Voiced by)
 Gabriela Gazelle (Voiced by)
 Griselda Giraffe (Voiced by)
 Kamilla Kangaroo (Voiced by)
 Lacey Lion (Voiced by)
 Ofelia Ostrich (Voiced by)
 Zadie Zebra (Voiced by)
 Antenna & Stompah - giraffe and elephant of Griselda
 Feathers, Flapper, & Rapid - ostriches of Ofelia
 Graceful, Mammoth, & Prunie - elephants of Esmeralda
 Joey, Stachel & Tote - kangaroos of Kamilla
 Manesy - lion of Lacey
 Racer - gazelle of Gabriela
 Ref - zebra of Zadie

Wishing Waters inhabitants
 Cameo Crab
 Clarita Clownfish
 Dolce Dolphin
 Jessa Jellyfish
 Sandella Seahorse
 Starling Starfish
 Taylee Turtle
 Bounder - turtle of Taylee
 Cackle - clownfish of Clarita
 Chela & Courtney - crabs of Cameo
 Idyl & Ripple - starfishes of Starling
 Kira & Serafina - seahorses of Sandella
 Largo - dolphin of Dolce
 Marisa - jellyfish of Jessa

Wonderwood inhabitants
 Blyss Bunny
 Bree Bunny (voiced by Maryke Hendrikse, Rachel Butera)
 Danessa Deer (voiced by Diana Kaarina, Tara Sands)
 Felicity Fox (voiced by Kazumi Evans, Kate Higgins, Julie Ann Taylor)
 Fluffy Bunny
 Saffi Swan
 Sage Skunk (voiced by Rebecca Shoichet, Rachel Butera)
 Patter Peacock (Recently moved) (voiced by Sabrina Pitre, Jonquil Goode)
 Caper - skunk of Sage (voiced by Rebecca Shoichet and Rachel Butera)
 Flap - peacock of Patter
 Flick - fox of Felicity (voiced by Kazumi Evans and Michelle Ruff)   
 Mop - bunny of Fluffy
 Oatsy - bunny of Blyss
 Poise - swan of Saffi
 Sprint - deer of Danessa (voiced by Sam Vincent and Doug Erholtz)
 Twist - bunny of Bree (voiced by Maryke Hendrikse and Rachel Butera)

Media
The by-products from Mattel's media strategy with Enchantimals include a web series, books and a television special.

References

External links

 

Mattel
Mattel franchises
Products introduced in 2017